A japamala, or simply mala (meaning 'garland') is a loop of prayer beads commonly used in Indian religions such as Hinduism, Jainism, Sikhism, and Buddhism for counting recitations when performing japa (reciting a mantra or other sacred sound) or for counting some other sadhana (spiritual practice) such as prostrating before a holy icon. They are similar to other forms of prayer beads used in various world religions and are sometimes referred to in Christianity as a "rosary".

The main body of a mala is usually 108 beads of roughly the same size and material as each other though smaller versions, often factors of 108 such as 54 or 27, exist. A distinctive 109th "guru bead", not used for counting, is very common. Mala beads have traditionally been made of a variety of materials such as wood, stone, seeds, bone and precious metals—with various religions often favouring certain materials—and strung with natural fibres such as cotton, silk, or animal hair. Mala can nowadays be found which are made from synthetic materials (such as plastic or glass beads, and nylon cords whether braided string or monofilament).

History

Origin 
The specific origin of the mala is unknown, with the use of beads for counting being a widespread practice in ancient cultures. No references to malas occur in Chinese literature before the introduction of Buddhism during the Han dynasty, suggesting that the practice spread from India to China and may have originated there. No mention of a mala occurs in the Agamas or Pali Nikayas, generally regarded as the oldest Buddhist literature, and it is unclear if their use originated with Buddhists or with Brahmins, Jains, or another Indian religious community.

Early attestations 
Malas may appear in early Brahmanic Hindu art as part of the garb of deities or worshippers, but are difficult to distinguish from decorative necklaces or garlands. The earliest clear depiction of a mala being used as a tool for recitation, rather than possibly being a necklace or decoration, comes from a bodhisattva image created during the 4th - 6th century Northern Wei dynasty in China; the mala is held in the hand, rather than worn.

No mention of this text occurs in standard bibliographies before the 6th century, but an independent translation in the 8th century suggests an origin as a Sanskrit text transmitted from Central Asia, rather than a Chinese composition. According to this text, the Buddha instructed a king to make a mala from the seeds of the aristaka plant and recite the Triratana while passing the mala through his fingers in order to calm his mind and relieve his anxiety.

China 
While the earliest Buddhist story about the mala is associated with lay practice, in China it was initially primarily associated with monastic practice. Images of monks with malas began to appear in China in the 7th century CE and the mala seems to have been regarded as a common piece of monastic equipment by around this era. While there are relatively few pre-Song Dynasty depictions or references to the mala, this may be due to its use in private religious practice rather than public ceremony. Chinese authors criticized monks who recited mantras on their malas in public, as monks were generally expected to remain silent while on public alms rounds.

By the Ming Dynasty-era, malas increasingly began to be valued for their aesthetic qualities as much or more than their spiritual use. Malas of expensive or rare materials became common as gifts given among the wealthy, and the materials allowed to different grades of wives and concubines was regulated by sumptuary laws. Depictions of Qing Dynasty court officials often include malas, intended to show their status and wealth rather than as an indication of spirituality.

Materials 

A wide variety of materials are used to make mala beads. Religious groups—notably Hindu Tantra and Vajrayana Buddhism—may favour certain materials in general or may favour certain materials dependent upon the desired effect of the spiritual practice for which the mala is being used.

Common materials are wood from the sandalwood tree or the bodhi tree, and seeds of the lotus plant.

Strings may be made from practically any fibre, traditionally silk or wool or cotton though synthetic monofilaments or cords such as nylon can now be found and are favoured for their low cost and good wear resistance. Elastic cords, such as milliner's elastic, may be used and have the advantage that they can stretch to fit over the wearer's hand if worn on the wrist whereas other material may not wrap a sufficient number of times to prevent the mala from slipping off. Beads may also be joined by metal chains.

Mala may also have a tassel hanging from the guru bead. This tassel need not be made from the same fibre as the string.

Hinduism 
Beads made from the fruitstones of the rudraksha tree are considered sacred by Saivas, devotees of Siva, while beads made from the wood of the tulsi plant are used and revered by Vaishnavas, followers of Vishnu.

Red and black hakik may be favoured for tamasic sadhanas, sphatik for praying to any deva, and red mūnga stone mainly for praising.

Hindu mala are commonly made with a small knot tied between each bead.

Buddhism 
Crystal, pearl, nacre, or other clear or white in colour beads may be used to count mantras used to appease devas or purify oneself; beads made of gold, silver, copper, or lotus seeds may be used to count mantras intended to increase lifespan, knowledge, or merit; beads made of ground sandal wood, saffron, and other fragrant substances may be used with mantras meant to tame others; mantras aiming at subduing malicious spirits or afflictions may be made from rudraksha seeds or human bones; and beads made of bodhi wood can be used for many purposes, for counting all kinds of mantras, as well as other prayers, prostration, circumambulation and so forth.

Tibetan Buddhism 
A general-purpose mala is made from rattan seeds; the beads themselves called "moon and stars" by Tibetans, and variously called "lotus root", "lotus seed" and "linden nut" by various retailers. The bead itself is very hard and dense, ivory-coloured (which gradually turns a deep golden brown with long use), and has small holes (moons) and tiny black dots (stars) covering its surface.

Some Tibetan Buddhist traditions call for the use of animal bone (most commonly yak), those of past Lamas being the most valuable. Semiprecious stones such as carnelian and amethyst may be used, as well. Red coral is highly prized for mala as the colour red is associated with the Padma family of buddhas (who are highly revered in Tibet). Wooden mala beads may have a shallow trench engraved around their equator into which tiny pieces of red coral and turquoise are affixed. Due to the cost of already harvested or fossilized red coral and its conservation status, as well as the cost of turquoise, plastic or glass may be used instead.

Nepal 
In Nepal, mala beads are made from the natural seeds of Ziziphus budhensis, a plant in the family Rhamnaceae endemic to the Temal region of Kavrepalanchok in Bagmati Province. The Government of Nepal's Ministry of Forestry has established a committee and begun to distribute seedlings of these plant so as to uplift the economic status of the people living in this area.

Number of beads 

There are numerous explanations why there are typically 108 beads, with the number 108 bearing special religious significance in a number of Hindu, Buddhist, and Jain traditions. For example, in traditional Buddhist thought, people are said to have 108 afflictions or kleshas. In another reckoning, 108 is the number of possible dharmas or phenomena; despite the varying explanations for the use of this number, the number itself has been kept consistent over centuries of practice. Smaller malas are also known, most commonly with a factor of 108 beads (such as 54, 27, or 18), and may be worn on the wrist or used to more conveniently keep count of prostrations.

Many mala will have a 109th bead which is variously called the guru, Sumeru, bindu, stupa, or mother bead. It is often larger or of a distinctive material or colour.  In some Buddhist traditions, the guru bead represents Amitabha or Avalokitesvara. Guru beads often have two holes drilled in that so that the cord can enter from each side separately but exit together. A decorative conical bead may rest at the exit point.

Additional beads 
Mala may have extra beads hanging from the guru bead. Especially when unable to move along the cord because knots hold them in place, these are decorative elements. They may or may not have religious symbolism (for example, three beads representing the Buddhist Triple Gem of Buddha, Dharma and Sangha) but are not used for counting recitations in any way.

Counting markers and cords 
Tibetan Buddhism can require that a practitioner complete a particular number of repetitions of an activity as a foundational practise or to become eligible for initiation into an esoteric teaching, for example, one may need to complete 100,000 recitations of Vajrasattva mantra. To aid this, Tibetan Buddhist mala can be made with additional functional beads over and above the 108 main beads. These beads take two main forms serving two different purposes: three marker beads inline with the 108 beads; two short cords of ten beads each hanging from the main loop.

Inline marker beads 
Three distinctive, often smaller, beads are placed so that, with the guru bead, they divide the regular beads into four sections of 27 beads each. They allow quick estimation of the fraction of a round completed. Their presence raises the number of beads (not counting the guru bead) to 111.

Beads on separate cords 
The short cords may either be permanently attached to the mala or they may be obtained separately; they do not need to match the main beads. These short cords may either be attached individually to the main loop or they may be joined at their common top. The cords end in small charms, usually a different charm on each, with a dorje and a bell shape being common. Their cord is thicker than normal so that the beads on them will not slide under their own weight but can be moved by the chanter.

After a single round of chanting, the user will slide up one bead on the cord with the dorje which represents 108 (or 111) recitations. After ten rounds all ten dorje beads have been moved up, one bead on the bell cord is raised  representing 1080 (or 1110) recitations and the dorje beads are all reset to their low position.

To keep track of more recitations, the chanter may use a small metal charm called a bhum counter. (Bhum, approximately pronounced "boom", is Tibetan for "one hundred thousand".) The bhum counter starts next to the guru bead and is attached to the main string by a clip or a slip knot. When the tenth bell bead has been raised (10 800 or 11 100 recitations), the chanter moves the bhum counter to the next space between beads (and resets the beads on the bell cord). By consistently moving the bhum counter in the same direction about 1.2 million recitations can be counted.

Religious usage 

Mantras are typically repeated hundreds or even thousands of times. The mala is used so that one can focus on the meaning or sound of the mantra rather than counting its repetitions.

In addition to their practical use as an aide in recitation, malas have traditionally been ascribed to have additional spiritual qualities. Different materials may be ascribed the power to help with different practical or spiritual problems, and the mala itself may be ascribed talismanic characteristics. In some traditions, malas are consecrated before use in a manner similar to images of deities, through the use of mantras, dharani, or the application of pigment. Malas purchased from temples and monasteries may have been blessed by the residents of that institution. Mala may also be blessed after purchase. Popular folk tales may describe malas as becoming imbued with the power of the many recitations it has been used for, or a mala given by a respected monk may be said to have the power to cure illnesses or to restore fertility to barren individuals.

Carrying and storing 
Mala may be worn by practitioners in several ways:

 Wrapped several times to fit on the wrist
 As a necklace, especially if made from large, consequently heavy, beads
 Suspended from a belt

However they are worn the wearer is supposed to keep the mala from making contact with the floor or ground.

Mala may be carried in small pouches from which they are removed before use. Some practitioners, such as members of ISKCON, may carry their malas in larger pouches which hang from the back of the hand and allow the mala to be manipulated while it is being used without it being significantly exposed to public view or risking contact with the ground.

In the home, mala may be stored in a pouch or not. Some practitioners may store their malas in jewelry boxes or similar containers. Practitioners who have an altar or shrine in their homes may additionally choose to keep their malas on the altar when not being used or carried.

Method of use 
The loop is draped over the index finger of the right hand (in Hindu practice: Buddhists often use the left hand) and held in place by the right thumb of the first bead next to the guru bead. As each recitation is completed the loop is advanced by one bead. Some practitioners will hold their other three fingers next to their index finger so that all four fingers are inside the loop. Other practitioners will have only their index finger inside the loop, separating this finger from the other three (for similar reasons as in the next paragraph).

Some practitioners will drape the loop over their second finger (with their third and fourth fingers also inside) and use their index finger to move the beads towards the thumb. This is said to be symbolic of the atma (represented by the index finger) moving towards Paramatma (represented by the thumb) by the vehicle of the mantra (the beads) overcoming elements of the material world (the three other fingers).

The guru bead is not used for counting repetitions; counting for each round begins and ends with either of the beads next to the guru bead. In the Hindu tradition and some Buddhist traditions, practitioners who undertake more than one round at a time will, rather than moving their fingers across the guru bead, turn the mala around so that the same bead which was used at the end of the previous round becomes the first bead use for the next round.

While there are typically 108 regular beads, some practitioners will count a round as only 100 repetitions to allow for an accidentally skipped bead or an imperfect recitation.

Buddhism

Japanese Buddhism 
Different Buddhist sects in Japan have different shaped juzus, and use them differently. For example, Shingon Buddhism, Tendai and Nichiren Buddhism may use longer prayer beads with strands on both ends similar to those used in mainland Asia. During devotional services, these beads may be rubbed together with both hands to create a soft grinding noise, which is considered to have a purifying and reverential effect. However, in Jōdo Shinshū, prayer beads are typically shorter and held draped over both hands and are not ground together, as this is forbidden.

Jōdo-shū is somewhat unusual because of the use of a double-ringed prayer beads, called , which are used for counting nenbutsu recitations (i.e. recitation of the name of Amitabha Buddha): one ring contains single beads used to count a single recitation while the other ring is used to count full revolutions of the first ring. Additionally, other beads hang from the strings, which can count full revolutions of the second ring (flat beads), or full revolutions of the first string of beads. In all, it is possible to count up to 120,000 recitations using these beads. The design is credited to a follower of Hōnen named Awanosuke.

Regardless of Buddhist sect, prayer beads used by lay followers are frequently smaller, featuring a factor of 108 beads. It is common to find prayer beads in Japan that contain a small image inside the largest bead, usually something associated with the particular temple or sect. When held up to the light the image is clearly visible.

Burmese Buddhism 
Theravada Buddhists in Myanmar use prayer beads called seik badi, shortened to badi. 108 beads are strung on a garland, with the beads typically made of fragrant wood like sandalwood, and series of brightly coloured strings at the end of the garland. It is commonly used in samatha meditation, to keep track of the number of mantras chanted during meditation.

Aesthetic usage 
In recent years, it has become common for non-religious individuals to wear such beads as a fashion accessory with the beads having no religious connotation whatsoever. Similar practices have been noted since the Ming Dynasty, when malas began to be used as fashionable accessories by members of the Chinese court. Sumptuary laws regulated the materials of malas in Qing Dynasty-era China.

Opinion is divided as to whether a mala that is worn as decoration can also be used for the practise of japa or if two separate malas are required.

Buddhist practise would refrain from ostentatious display of a mala, whether as a show of wealth or a claim of piety. As a self-reminder of one's beliefs or a non-invasive symbol that may inspire others to follow the dharma they may be acceptable.

See also 

 Prayer beads and rope
 Rudraksha
 Misbaha
 Rosary
 Garlands and beadwork
 Phuang malai
 Worry beads
 Associated prayers and mantras
 Om Namah Shivaya
 Om mani padme hum
 Namokar Mantra
 Jaap Sahib

References

Bibliography 

 
 
 
 
 
 
 
 
 
 
 
 
 
 
 

Prayer Beads
Prayer beads
Meditation
Buddhist symbols
Buddhist ritual implements